Plain Township is one of the nineteen townships of Wood County, Ohio, United States.  The 2010 census found 1,663 people in the township.

Geography
Located in the center of the county, it borders the following townships:
Middleton Township - north
Center Township - east
Portage Township - southeast corner
Liberty Township - south
Milton Township - southwest corner
Weston Township - west
Washington Township - northwest

Part of the city of Bowling Green, the county seat of Wood County, is located in eastern Plain Township.

Name and history
Plain Township was established in 1835. The township was named for the level plains within its borders. Statewide, other Plain Townships are located in Franklin, Stark, and Wayne counties.

Government
The township is governed by a three-member board of trustees, who are elected in November of odd-numbered years to a four-year term beginning on the following January 1. Two are elected in the year after the presidential election and one is elected in the year before it. There is also an elected township fiscal officer, who serves a four-year term beginning on April 1 of the year after the election, which is held in November of the year before the presidential election. Vacancies in the fiscal officership or on the board of trustees are filled by the remaining trustees.

References

External links
County website

Townships in Wood County, Ohio
Townships in Ohio